Nader Ouarda (born 21 June 1974) is a retired Tunisian footballer. He played as offensive midfielder. Following his playing career, he became a manager.

Career
He has played for the following Tunisian clubs during the sixteen years of his career:

1992-1996 : Océano Club de Kerkennah
1996-1998 : Club africain
1998-2000 : El Makarem de Mahdia
2000-2001 : AS Kasserine
2001-2002 : Étoile Sportive du Sahel
2002-2003 : ES Beni-Khalled
2003-2005 : El Makarem de Mahdia
2005-2007 : Océano Club de Kerkennah
2007-2008 : Stade sportif sfaxien

He also participated in the rise of El Makarem de Mahdia in 2003-2004 and the rise of Océano Club de Kerkennah in 1995-1996, and Étoile sportive de Béni Khalled in 2002-2003.

Ouarda was also the captain of the Tunisia under-21 national team and played one game for the senior Tunisia national football team during 1994.

Wins as player
Arab Champions League
Winner: 1997
Tunisian President Cup
Winner: 1998
 Tunisian Ligue Professionnelle 2
 Winner of (South Pole) : 1995-1996
National C League cup
Winner:2005–2006

References

1974 births
Living people
Tunisian footballers
Tunisia international footballers
Océano Club de Kerkennah players
Club Africain players
El Makarem de Mahdia players
AS Kasserine players
Étoile Sportive du Sahel players
ES Beni-Khalled players
Stade Sportif Sfaxien players
Place of birth missing (living people)
Association footballers not categorized by position